Adugodi is a neighborhood in Bangalore, India. It is located along Hosur Road, close to Jayanagara, Koramangala and Madiwala.

The Forum (shopping mall) and Shantinagar Bus Station are located close to Adugodi.

Neighbourhoods in Bangalore